The 1985 NCAA Division I baseball tournament was played at the end of the 1985 NCAA Division I baseball season to determine the national champion of college baseball.  The tournament concluded with eight teams competing in the College World Series, a double-elimination tournament in its thirty-ninth year.  Eight regional competitions were held to determine the participants in the final event.  Five regions held a four-team, double-elimination tournament while three regions included six teams, resulting in 38 teams participating in the tournament at the conclusion of their regular season, and in some cases, after a conference tournament.  The thirty-ninth tournament champion was Miami (FL), coached by Ron Fraser.  The Most Outstanding Player was Greg Ellena of Miami (FL).

Regionals
The tournament's opening rounds were played across eight regional sites across the country, each consisting of either a four-team field or a six-team field. Each regional tournament is double-elimination, however region brackets are variable depending on the number of teams remaining after each round. The winners of each regional advanced to the College World Series.

Bold indicates winner.

Atlantic Regional at Coral Gables, FL

Central Regional at Austin, TX

East Regional at Columbia, SC

Midwest Regional at Stillwater, OK

South I Regional at Starkville, MS

South II Regional at Tallahassee, FL

West I Regional at Stanford, CA

West II Regional at Fresno, CA

College World Series

Participants

Results

Bracket

Game results

All-Tournament Team
The following players were members of the All-Tournament Team.

Notable players
 Arizona: Chip Hale, Tommy Hinzo, Joe Magrane, Dave Rohde
 Arkansas: Kevin Campbell, Howard Hilton, Fred Farwell, Jeff King, Jimmy Kremers, Pat Rice
 Miami (FL):
 Mississippi State: Jeff Brantley, Will Clark, Rafael Palmeiro, Bobby Thigpen
 Oklahoma State: Jeff Bronkey, Doug Dascenzo, Carlos Diaz, Gordon Dillard, Pete Incaviglia
 South Carolina: Mike Cook, Dave Hollins
 Stanford: Rubén Amaro, Jr., Jeff Ballard, Mark Davis, Jack McDowell, Al Osuna, John Ramos, Pete Stanicek
 Texas: Billy Bates, Dennis Cook, James Castillion, Rick Parker, Mark Petkovsek, Rusty Richards, Bruce Ruffin, Greg Swindell

See also
 1985 NCAA Division I softball tournament
 1985 NCAA Division II baseball tournament
 1985 NCAA Division III baseball tournament
 1985 NAIA World Series

References

NCAA Division I Baseball Championship
Tournament
NCAA Division I baseball
Baseball in Austin, Texas
Baseball in Nebraska